Hexoplon speciosum is a species of beetle in the family Cerambycidae. It was described by Dr. Coleman Bacon in 1937.

References

Hexoplonini
Beetles described in 1937